IC 755, also known as NGC 4019, is a barred spiral galaxy. It lies about 60 million light-years away (18 Megaparsecs) in the northern constellation of Coma Berenices. It is a member of the Virgo Cluster.

In 1999 a star within IC 755 was seen to explode as a supernova and named SN 1999an. Supernovae like SN 1999an are classified as Type IIs and they are dramatic events that mark the end of the lives of massive stars. The supernova was discovered by the Beijing Astronomical Observatory Supernova Survey.

References

External links 
 

Barred spiral galaxies
NGC objects
37912
0755
07001
Coma Berenices
Virgo Cluster